Giovanni Greppi (born August 6, 1910 in Pezzana) was an Italian professional football player.

1910 births
Year of death missing
Italian footballers
Serie A players
Juventus F.C. players
S.S.D. Varese Calcio players
Association football midfielders
A.S.D. La Biellese players
People from Pezzana
Footballers from Piedmont
Sportspeople from the Province of Vercelli